Alexander Shaw (January 13, 1833 – April 21, 1911) was a Canadian lawyer and political figure. He represented Bruce South in the House of Commons of Canada as a Liberal-Conservative member from 1878 to 1882.

He was born in Ramsay Township, Upper Canada in 1833, the son of John Shaw. He was educated in Perth and studied law there. In 1853, he moved to Bruce County and settled at Kincardine. Shaw married Anna Robertson. He later moved to Walkerton and became solicitor for the county in 1867. He also served as mayor of Walkerton. Shaw defeated Edward Blake in Bruce South in the general election of 1878; he ran unsuccessfully against Rupert Mearse Wells in the riding of Bruce East in 1882.

His brother William McNairn Shaw was also a lawyer and served in the Ontario legislative assembly.

External links
 
The Canadian parliamentary companion and annual register, 1880, CH Mackintosh
The History of the County of Bruce : and of the minor municipalities therein, province of Ontario, Canada, N Robertson

1833 births
1911 deaths
Members of the House of Commons of Canada from Ontario
Conservative Party of Canada (1867–1942) MPs
Mayors of places in Ontario